or  (singular , also spelled as femmeniello) are a population of people who embody a third gender role in traditional Neapolitan culture It may be hard to define this term within modern Western notions of "gay men" versus "trans women" since both these categories overlap to a degree in the case of . This term is not derogatory and does not carry a stigma; instead  are traditionally believed to bring good luck.

Etymology
The name of this role means 'little women-men'. This is derived from Neapolitan femmena 'woman' with the suffix -iello, which is a diminutive term of endearment, with a masculine -o ending. This is neither derogatory nor an insult.

Gender analysis
It is reductive to insert the Neapolitan femminiello within the macro-category of "transgender" usually adopted in Northern European and North American contexts. According to University of Naples Federico II professor Eugenio Zito, "The alternative identity of femminielli is possible from a transformed, disguised, and transfigured body, a complex phenomenon that could be considered 'endemic', and is peculiarly linked to the territory and the population of the city". The femminiello, instead, could be considered as a peculiar gender expression, despite a widespread sexual binarism. The cultural roots that this phenomenon is embedded in confer to the femminiello a cultural and even socially legitimized status. For the historical and symbolic coordinates of Naples, the identity construct of the femminiello is not superimposable to more common European and euro-centric transgender clusters.

In late 2000s many sex scandals have rocked Italy involving high-profile politicians (e.g., former President of Lazio, Piero Marrazzo) and transgender sex workers often of Latin American descent, who are usually referred to as transessuali (shortened to trans) in Italian media. In 2009 the term femminiello gained some notoriety in Italian media after a Naples native femminiello Camorra mobster Ketty Gabriele was arrested. Gabriele had engaged in prostitution prior to becoming a capo. Gabriele has been referred to both as a femminiello and transessuale or trans in Italian media.

However, others maintain that i femminielli are decidedly male despite their female gender role, saying that "they are male; they know it and everyone else knows it." Achille della Ragione has written of social aspects of femminielli. "[The femminiello] is usually the youngest male child, 'mother's little darling,' ... he is useful, he does chores, runs errands and watches the kids."

Zito proposes in his study that the femminielli "seem to confirm, in the field of gender identity, the postmodern idea of continuous modulation between the masculine and the feminine against their dichotomy."

History

The constant references in many sources to the ancient rituals behind the presence of the femminiello in Naples require little comment. The links to ancient Greek mythology are numerous: for example, Hermaphroditus, who possessed the beauty of their mother, Aphrodite, and the strength of their father, Hermes; or Tiresias, the  blind prophet of Thebes, famous for being transformed into a woman for seven years. Both of these personages and, indeed, others in many cultures in the world are presumed to possess something that others do not: the wise equilibrium that comes from knowing both worlds, masculine and feminine.

The history of the femminielli may trace back to a real, non-mythological group: the Galli (also called Galloi or Gallae, singular gallus), a significant portion of the ancient priesthood of the mother goddess Cybele and her consort Attis. This tradition began in Phrygia (where Turkey is today, part of Asia Minor), sometime before 300 BC. After 205 BC, the tradition entered the city of Rome, and spread throughout the Roman Empire, as far north as London. They were eunuchs who wore bright-colored feminine sacerdotal clothing, hairstyles or wigs, makeup, and jewelry, and used feminine mannerisms in their speech. They addressed one another by feminine titles, such as sister. There were other priests and priestesses of Cybele who were not eunuchs, so it would not have been necessary to become a gallus or eunuch in order to become a priest of Cybele. The Gallae were not ascetic but hedonistic, so castration was not about stopping sexual desires. Some Gallae would marry men, and others would marry women. The ways of the Gallae were more consistent with transgender people with gender dysphoria, which they relieved by voluntary castration, as the available form of sex reassignment surgery.

Contemporaries who were not Gallae called them by masculine words, Galloi or Galli (plural), or Gallus (singular). Some historians interpret the Gallae as transgender, by modern terms, and think they would have called themselves by the feminine Gallae (plural) and Galla (singular). The Roman poet Ovid (43 BC – 17 AD) says their name comes from the Gallus river in Phrygia;

Phrygians and Romans believed the Gallae had spiritual powers to tell the future, bless homes, have power over wild animals, bring rain, and exorcise evil spirits. The Roman public viewed them with a mixture of awe and contempt, seeing them as practicing shocking foreign customs, so they were just as often honored as they were harassed and politically persecuted. They were not allowed to be Roman citizens, and vice versa.

Ceremony
A ceremony called the matrimonio dei femminielli takes place in Torre Annunziata on Easter Monday, where a parade of femminielli dressed in wedding gowns and accompanied by a "husband" travel through the streets in horse-drawn carriages.

Tradition
The femminiello in Campania enjoy a relatively privileged position thanks to their participation in some traditional events, such as Candelora al Santuario di Montevergine (Candlemas at the Sanctuary of Montevergine) in Avellino or the Tammurriata, a traditional dance performed at the feast of Madonna dell'Arco in Sant'Anastasia.

Generally femminielli are considered to bring good luck. For this reason, it is popular in the neighborhoods for a femminiello to hold a newborn baby, or participate in games such as bingo. Above all the Tombola or Tombolata dei femminielli, a popular game performed every year on the 2nd of February, as the conclusive part of the Candlemas at the Sanctuary of Montevergine.

Theatre
In a stage production called  ('The Cat Cinderella'), by Roberto De Simone, femmenielli play the roles of several important characters. Among the major scenes in this respect are the rosario dei femmenielli and il suicidio del femminiella.

See also
 LGBT rights in Italy
 List of transgender-related topics
 Travesti
 Two-spirit

Notes

References
 Carrano, Gennaro and Simonelli, Pino, Un mariage dans la baie de Naples; Naples ville travestie; special issue Mediterranée, "Masques", été 1983 (numéro 18), pp. 106–116.
 Dall'Orto, Giovanni, Ricchioni, femmenelle e zamel: l'"omosessualità mediterranea". 
 De Blasio, Abele; (1897); ‘O spusarizio masculino (il matrimonio fra due uomini), in: Usi e costumi dei camorristi; Gambella, Naples. Reprint: Edizioni del Delfino, Naples 1975, pp. 153-158.
 della Ragione A. I Femminielli. On-line at Guide Campania. (retrieved: Nov. 12, 2009)
 Malaparte, Curzio. La Pelle. Vallechi editore. Florence. 1961
 Eugenio Zito, Paolo Valerio, Corpi sull'uscio, identità possibili. Il fenomeno dei femminielli a Napoli, Filema, 2010
 Zito, Eugenio. "Disciplinary crossings and methodological contaminations in gender research: a psycho-anthropological survey on Neapolitan femminielli." International Journal of Multiple Research Approaches, vol. 7, no. 2, 2013, p. 204+. Academic OneFile, http://link.galegroup.com.uaccess.univie.ac.at/apps/doc/A354578053/AONE?u=43wien&sid=AONE&xid=103bdda0. Accessed 23 Oct. 2018.

External links

  Mythology of femminielli in Naples
  The femminielli, from the book "Le ragioni di della Ragione"
  The world of the "femminiello", culture and tradition
 Videoclip: Peppe Barra - Il Matrimonio di Vincenzella - theatre performance.

Effeminacy
Femininity
Gender in Italy
Gender systems
Third gender
Culture in Naples